Rio Cuarto may refer to:

Río Cuarto (canton), Heredia Province, Costa Rica
Río Cuarto, Córdoba
Cuarto River
Rio Cuarto craters
Río Cuarto Department